Built in 1914, the 4000-seat Church of the Open Door was conceived by R. A. Torrey who had come to Los Angeles to start a Bible institute (now known as Biola University) similar to Moody Bible Institute. The church was to be strictly non-denominational, though Evangelical. Its mission was to reach the lost of Los Angeles, which was reflected in the name based on two passages of Scripture: John 10:9 and Revelation 3:8. Other pastors have included Louis T. Talbot (1932–1948) and J. Vernon McGee (1949–1970). The current Pastor is David Anderson.

Founding and history
In 1915 Torrey announced plans to organize an independent church that would meet in Biola's auditorium called the Church of the Open Door. This decision proved controversial with local Presbyterian and Baptist clergy.

For 70 years the church was located in downtown Los Angeles on Hope Street and 6th St. (536 South Hope St.). Among its members was Rudy Atwood, who became staff pianist in 1968. The church held large Youth for Christ rallies on Saturday nights, with Atwood playing piano.

The church relocated to Glendora, California in 1985.  The original downtown church building was demolished in the late 1980s. Despite efforts led by the late William Eugene Scott to prevent the building from being sold to developers and to have the building saved as a historic landmark, the building could not be saved. It was so damaged in the 1987 Whittier Narrows earthquake that it was declared unsafe and the cost of repairs deemed prohibitive. One of the two historic "Jesus Saves" signs from the original building can now be seen atop the Ace Hotel Los Angeles. It was relocated there by the late William Eugene Scott who took it with him when his church (Los Angeles University Cathedral) relocated following the earthquake.

Glendora

When the church moved to Glendora in 1985, it purchased land from Azusa Pacific University. It is still a thriving congregation, with about 500 worshipers every Sunday. David Anderson is the current Senior Pastor, with David Schaller serving as Associate Pastor and David Newkirk serving as Next Generation Pastor. There are three services every Sunday at 8:00 am, 9:45 am and 11:00am   are in the Worship Center, which is located just South of the gym. A variety of Sunday School classes are available, including ones for adults, and ones for children and teenagers. HUB (Home Unity Bible) groups meet weekly in local church families homes. This small group ministry is centered on fellowship and discussion of the pastor's sermon from Sunday.  COD kids Church during the 9:45am service and young adults Ministry Intersect is on Sundays at 5pm
https://www.churchoftheopendoor.com/intersect/

Pastors
Senior Pastor: David Anderson
Associate Pastor: David Schaller
Next Generation Pastor: David Newkirk
Worship Pastor: Josh Kim
Children's Pastor: Jessica Lee
Student Ministries Pastor: Ryan Berkman 
Jr High Lead: Parker Vincent

See also
Biola University

References

External links
 

Churches in Los Angeles
Evangelical churches in California
Buildings and structures in Downtown Los Angeles
Demolished buildings and structures in Los Angeles
Demolished churches in the United States
Former churches in California